British Instructional Films was a British film production company which operated between 1919 and 1932. The company's name is often abbreviated to BIF.

The company released a number of feature films during the late silent and early sound eras, developing a reputation for making First World War films and documentary shorts. In 1928, the company constructed Welwyn Studios. The company was later merged into the larger British International Pictures, which took over the running of the facility in Welwyn Garden City.

Selected films
 Nelson (1926)
 The Battles of Coronel and Falkland Islands (1927)
 Shooting Stars (1927)
 Widecombe Fair (1928)
 Sin (1928)
 The Runaway Princess (1929)
 Lost Patrol (1929)
 Tell England (1931)

References

Bibliography
 Low, Rachael, History of the British Film, 1918-1929 (George Allen & Unwin, 1971)

External links
British Instructional Films at IMDB

British film studios
Film production companies of the United Kingdom
Mass media companies established in 1919
Mass media companies disestablished in 1932
1919 establishments in England
1932 disestablishments in England
British companies disestablished in 1932
British companies established in 1919